Salegudem is a village in Rangareddy district in Andhra Pradesh, India.

References

Villages in Ranga Reddy district